Joseph Dechi Gomwalk (13 April 1935 – 15 May 1976) was a Nigerian police commissioner and the first Military Governor of Benue-Plateau State after it was formed from part of Northern Region. He was executed due to his connections to Buka Suka Dimka's attempted coup against Murtala Mohammed's government.

Education
Gomwalk was Ngas from Ampang (Pang) in the present Kanke Local Government Area of Plateau State. He attended the famous Boys Secondary School Gindiri where he graduated with distinctions in both academics and sports.  He proceeded to the premier University of Ibadan and graduated with a degree in Zoology.

Governorship of Benue-Plateau State
Gomwalk was Governor of the state from 1967until 1975, when military head of state Yakubu Gowon's regime was toppled in a coup d'état.

A Visionary Leader
While Governor, Gomwalk started the Nigerian Standard in 1972; as of 2003, it is a government-owned daily located on Joseph Gomwalk Road in Jos, and has a circulation of 100,000. After failing to get Ahmadu Bello University of Zaria to open a satellite campus in the state, he turned to the University of Ibadan; that institution opened its Jos campus (which later became the University of Jos) in November 1971.

In August 1974, affidavits alleging corruption on the part of Gomwalk and Joseph Tarka, Benue-Plateau State's representative to the Federal Executive Council, were published; Tarka resigned, but Gomwalk, with Gowon's support, remained in office.

Execution
After Gowon's overthrow and the installation of Murtala Mohammed, Gomwalk was implicated in Buka Suka Dimka's attempted coup of February 13, 1976, and he and Dimka were executed by firing squad on May 15, 1976.

References

External links

Scan of Daily Times newspaper announcing Gomwalk and Dimka's execution

1976 deaths
Governors of Plateau State
Nigerian police officers
People from Plateau State
Executed politicians
20th-century executions by Nigeria
Executed Nigerian people
People executed by Nigeria by firing squad
University of Ibadan alumni
1935 births